Klęczany may refer to:

Klęczany, Gorlice County in Lesser Poland Voivodeship (south Poland)
Klęczany, Nowy Sącz County in Lesser Poland Voivodeship (south Poland)
Klęczany, Subcarpathian Voivodeship (south-east Poland)